With the creation of the Asian Club Football Championship, this games was held to determine Iran's representative in that competition. Five Tehran teams competed periodically, including Taj, Oghab, Persepolis, Pas and Shahrbani. In the end of matches, Persepolis became champion with seven points (3 wins and 1 draw) and was introduced to the 1969 Asian Club Championship as Iran's representative.

 In this game, the players of PAS refused to continue the game in protest of the referee's decision in the 40th minute and Taj won 3–0 with the Football Federation technical committee's opinion.

References

Asian Club Championship seasons